Florence Jacqueline Sylvie Devouard, (born 10 September 1968) is a French agricultural engineer who served as the chair of the Wikimedia Foundation board of trustees between October 2006 and July 2008.

Education
Devouard holds an engineering degree in agronomy from ENSAIA and a DEA in genetics and biotechnologies from INPL.

Career
On 9 March 2008, Devouard was elected member of the municipal council of Malintrat.

Devouard joined the board of Wikimedia Foundation in June 2004 as chair of the board of trustees, succeeding Jimmy Wales. She has served on the Advisory Board of the Foundation since July 2008.

Co-founder of Wikimedia France in October 2004, she was vice-chair of its board as of 2011 until December 2012.

Recognition
On 16 May 2008, she was made a knight in the French National Order of Merit, proposed by the Ministry of Foreign Affairs as "chair of an international foundation".

See also

 List of Wikipedia people

References

Specific

Further reading
 Lih, Andrew. The Wikipedia Revolution: How a Bunch of Nobodies Created the World's Greatest Encyclopedia. Hyperion, New York City. 2009. First Edition.  (alkaline paper).

External links

 Anthere Consulting website 
 Personal blog
 Wikimedia Foundation and sustainability
 
 2005 Board candidacy presentation
 Video-Interview on 10 February 2007 at the Lift07 conference in Geneva
  Interview with Florence Devouard.
 'Madame Wikipedia' runs web giant from village HQ  2007 AFP article
 A Life in the Day: Florence Devouard 2007 Times article

1968 births
Living people
Chairpersons of organizations
Chairwomen
Knights of the Ordre national du Mérite
French Wikimedians
French women engineers
People from Versailles
Wikimedia Foundation Advisory Board members
Wikimedia Foundation Board of Trustees members
Wikimédia France
21st-century women engineers
20th-century women engineers
21st-century French engineers
20th-century French engineers
Agricultural engineers
20th-century French women
21st-century French women